Andrew Pope may refer to:
 Andrew Pope (cricketer)
 Andrew Pope (singer)

See also
 Andy Pope, American golfer